Lamb Range is a locality in the Cairns Region, Queensland, Australia.

Geography 
The locality takes its name from the mountain range Lamb Range.

The locality that lies to the west of most of the southern suburbs of Cairns. It is undeveloped mountainous land rising from the coastal plains (elevation of less than 50 metres above sea level) up through the Great Dividing Range (with elevations up to 1200 metres) towards the Atherton Tableland. The land use is entirely committed to national parks and reserves. Dinden National Park and Lake Morris Reserve are in the north of the locality with Little Mulgrave National Park in the south. A small area in the west is in the Danbulla National Park.

There is only one road through the locality. The Gillies Range Road (also known as the Gillies Highway) passes through the south of the locality connecting Gordonvale in the Cairns Region with Atherton in the Tablelands Region. Lake Morris Road commences in Kanimbla and passes through Mooroobool and then travels through Lamb Range to Lake Morris but does not extend beyond the dam.

Attractions 

The road is winding with 263 corners and has a number of lookouts.

References

External links 

Cairns Region
Localities in Queensland